Masha United is a Pakistani professional football club based in Faisalabad, Punjab.

The men's team plays in the Pakistan Premier League, the top tier of Pakistani football and was promoted to PPL after winning the department phase of  the 2020 PFF League.

The women's team plays in the National Women Football Championship, the top cup competition for women's football clubs in Pakistan, and made its debut in 2021.

Rai Ali Intkhab is the team owner, while Rana Muhammad Ashraf serves as the club president. Rana Ismail is the current head coach. It is supported by the Shahid Afridi Foundation.

Men's team 
Masha United was formed in 2019 when the Pakistan Football Federation announced the 2019 PFF National Challenge Cup in which Masha United would make its debut. However, Masha United couldn't participate in the event.

In February 2020, the 2020 PFF League was announced by Pakistan Football Federation and Masha United was in Group C along with Pakistan Railways, Atletico Madrid Lahore and Hazara Coal. On 14 March 2020, Masha United was to make its debut against Hazara Coal, but this was abandoned due to coronavirus fears in Pakistan. After PFF League was restarted, Masha United defeated Hazara Coal and Pakistan Railways to advance to the departmental final leg. In the departmental final leg, they were undefeated and they were promoted to the 2021 Pakistan Premier League, the first tier of Pakistan Football Federation.

Nasir Ismail was announced as the head coach of Masha United for the 2021 Pakistan Premier League.

In December 2020, Masha United debuted in the PFF National Challenge Cup, the top cup of Pakistan football.

Women's team
Masha United's women's team made its debut at the 13th National Women Football Championship held in Karachi in March 2021 as a last-minute entrant. To form a competitive team, it recruited four players from the 2021 Nepalese champions Armed Police Force (APF), which included the league’s best player, Saru Limbu.

It finished top of its group, scoring 60 goals in four matches. It included a 19-0 win over Sialkot, a 4-0 triumph over Higher Education Commission, a 35-0 victory over Karachi, and a 2-2 draw with Karachi United. They reached the semifinals before the tournament was cancelled.

Rivalries 
Masha United have a rivalry with Karachi United with which they have the United Derby. The derby started in the 2020 PFF League where the match ended in a tie.

Honours

Domestic
 PFF League 
 Winners (1): 2020

References 

Football clubs in Pakistan
Association football clubs established in 2019
2019 establishments in Pakistan
Football in Faisalabad